Swedish county road 260 (Länsväg 260) is a primary county road in Sweden from the  junction on the border of Stockholm and Nacka to the Handen junction beneath national road 73 in Haninge.

Between those endpoints, the road goes through Sickla – Saltsjö-Järla – Hästhagen – Älta – Trollbäcken – Vendelsö. South of Älta, between Älta junction and Skrubba junction, it shares a short common section with county road 229, which is also the only motorway section of county road 260.

County road 260